is a Japanese professional wrestling stable, based in the Pro Wrestling Noah (Noah) promotion. It was founded by Takashi Sugiura in 2019 and lead by him ever since.

History

Formation
Takashi Sugiura and Kazma Sakamoto shared a feud after the events from the fourth night of the NOAH Navigation For Progress 2019 from February 24, where Sakamoto teamed up with "Hooligans" stablemates Cody Hall, Maybach Taniguchi, Mitsuya Nagai and Yuji Hino to face the team of Sugiura, Akitoshi Saito, Kinya Okada, Masao Inoue and Yoshiki Inamura in a loser unit must disband match. The bout concluded after Sugiura pinned Sakamoto, attracting the disbanding of "Hooligans" in the processs. Sakamoto wanted to take revenge on Sugiura so at NOAH Great Voyage In Yokohama, an even promoted on March 10, 2019, they faced each other in a singles match, bout which solded with the victory of Sugiura. Sakamoto however brought Nosawa Rongai to ringside with the latter not getting involved in their match. After the bout concluded, all three of them shook hands and alligned each other to found the unit which was later announced to go under the name of "Sugiura-gun".

Under Takashi Sugiura's leadership (2019–present)

As Sugiura was appointed as the leader of the unit, he worked to help raise the team's notoriety in the promotion. At NOAH N-1 Victory 2019 on November 2, he defeated Michael Elgin to become the first-ever GHC National Champion. Earlier in the year, he made it to the finals of the 2019 edition of the N-1 Victory where he fell short to Kenoh. On the finals night of the  On the finals of the 2019 Global Junior Heavyweight Tag League, Takashi Sugiura and Kazma Sakamoto defeated AXIZ (Go Shiozaki and Katsuhiko Nakajima) to win the GHC Tag Team Championship.

At CyberFight Festival 2021, Takashi Sugiura and Kazushi Sakuraba defeated Danshoku Dino and Super Sasadango Machine.

At Noah Bumper Crop 2022 In Sendai on January 16, Kazushi Sakuraba, Kazuyuki Fujita, Kendo Kashin and Takashi Sugiura defeated  Funky Express (King Tany and Mohammed Yone), Go Shiozaki and Masakatsu Funaki. At Noah Gain Control 2022 In Nagoya on February 23, Kendo Kashin fought Masato Tanaka in a double count-out, Takashi Sugiura teamed up with Naomichi Marufuji to defeat Masa Kitamiya and Yoshiki Inamura, and Kazuyuki Fujita defeated Katsuhiko Nakajima to win the GHC Heavyweight Championship. At Noah Great Voyage in Fukuoka 2022 on March 21, Hideki Suzuki, Kazushi Sakuraba, Kendo Kashin and Takashi Sugiura defeated Kongo (Katsuhiko Nakajima, Kenoh, Manabu Soya and Masakatsu Funaki), and Kazuyuki Fujita defended the GHC Heavyweight Championship against Masato Tanaka. On the second night of Noah Majestic 2022 from April 30, Kazushi Sakuraba and Kendo Kashin defeated Don Fujii and Masaaki Mochizuki, El Hijo del Dr. Wagner Jr. and René Duprée defeated Daiki Inaba and Masato Tanaka, and Hideki Suzuki and Takashi Sugiura successfully defended the GHC Tag Team Championship against Kongo (Katsuhiko Nakajima and Kenoh). At Noah Dream On Final 2022 on May 21, Kazuyuki Fujita defeated Kinya Okada, Hideki Suzuki and Takashi Sugiura teamed up with Masaaki Mochizuki to defeat Kongo (Katsuhiko Nakajima, Manabu Soya and Masakatsu Funaki), and El Hijo del Dr. Wagner Jr. and René Duprée dropped the GHC Tag Team Championship to Masa Kitamiya and Michael Elgin. At CyberFight Festival 2022 on June 12, El Hijo de Dr. Wagner Jr., René Duprée and Timothy Thatcher teamed up with Michael Elgin and Simon Gotch to defeat Takashi Sugiura, Kazuyuki Fujita, Masa Kitamiya, Daiki Inaba and Shuhei Taniguchi in five-man tag team action. At Noah Destination 2022 on July 16, El Hijo del Dr. Wagner Jr. and René Duprée teamed up with Anthony Greene, Simon Gotch and Stallion Rogers to defeat Daiki Inaba, Kazushi Sakuraba, Kinya Okada, Masaaki Mochizuki and Shuhei Taniguchi, Kazuyuki Fujita and Takashi Sugiura teamed up with Go Shiozaki to defeat Kongo (Katsuhiko Nakajima, Manabu Soya and Masakatsu Funaki), Hideki Suzuki and Timothy Thatcher defeated The Tough (Masa Kitamiya and Yoshiki Inamura). At Noah Departure 2022 on August 5, Takashi Sugiura teamed up with Go Shiozaki and Naomichi Marufuji to defeat Daiki Inaba, Masato Tanaka and Satoshi Kojima. At Noah Grand Ship In Nagoya 2022 on September 25, Hideki Suzuki and Timothy Thatcher dropped the GHC Tag Team Championship to Satoshi Kojima and Takashi Sugiura. At Noah Ariake Triumph 2022 on October 30, El Hijo del Dr. Wagner Jr. and Hideki Suzuki defeated Masa Kitamiya and Masato Tanaka, Kazushi Sakuraba unsuccessfully challenged Masakatsu Funaki for the GHC National Championship, Satoshi Kojima and Takashi Sugiura successfully defended the GHC Tag Team Championship against Kongo (Katsuhiko Nakajima and Kenoh) and Kazuyuki Fujita unsuccessfully challenged Kaito Kiyomiya for the GHC Heavyweight Championship. At Noah Global Honored Crown 2022 on November 10, Satoshi Kojima and Takashi Sugiura successfully defended the GHC Tag Team Championship against Funky Express (Akitoshi Saito and Mohammed Yone), El Hijo del Dr. Wagner Jr. defeated Masakatsu Funaki to win the GHC National Championship, and Timothy Thatcher unsuccessfully challenged Kaito Kiyomiya for the GHC Heavyweight Championship. At Noah The Best 2022 on November 23, Kazuyuki Fujita, Takashi Sugiura and Timothy Thatcher fell short against Masaaki Mochizuki, Masato Tanaka and Naomichi Marufuji, and El Hijo del Dr. Wagner Jr. successfully defended the GHC National Championship against Yoshiki Inamura.

At Noah The New Year 2023 on January 1, Kazuyuki Fujita and Kendo Kashin teamed up with Nosawa Rongai and Hiroshi Hase to defeat Kongo (Katsuhiko Nakajima, Masakatsu Funaki, Manabu Soya and Hajime Ohara) and Timothy Thatcher fell short to Jack Morris. At The Great Muta Final "Bye-Bye" on January 22, Timothy Thatcher defeated Masaaki Mochizuki, Kazushi Sakuraba defeated Hideki Suzuki by referee stoppage, and El Hijo de Dr. Wagner Jr. and Takashi Sugiura teamed up with Kaito Kiyomiya and Satoshi Kojima to defeat Kongo (Kenoh, Katsuhiko Nakajima, Masakatsu Funaki and Manabu Soya). At Noah Great Voyage in Osaka 2023 on February 12, Timothy Thatcher, Kazuyuki Fujita and Hideki Suzuki are scheduled to face Masato Tanaka, Masaaki Mochizuki and Yoshiki Inamura, and Takashi Sugiura and Satoshi Kojima will defend the GHC Tag Team Championship against Masa Kitamiya and Daiki Inaba.

New Japan Pro Wrestling (2022–present)
Due to Pro Wrestling Noah sharing a business partnership with New Japan Pro Wrestling, various members of the stable participated in the latter's biggest yearly event, the Wrestle Kingdom, usually on the second or third night dedicated to inter-promotional prizeless matches. At Wrestle Kingdom 16 on January 8, 2022, Takashi Sugiura and Kazushi Sakuraba teamed up with Toru Yano to defeat Suzuki-gun (Taichi, Minoru Suzuki and Taka Michinoku). At Wrestle Kingdom 17 on January 21, Takashi Sugiura teamed up with Satoshi Kojima, Toru Yano and Hiroshi Tanahashi to defeat Bullet Club (El Phantasmo, Kenta and Gedo) and Naomichi Marufuji.

Members

Current members

Former members

Associates

Sub-groups

Current

Timeline

Championships and accomplishments
Pro Wrestling Noah
GHC Heavyweight Championship (1 time) – Fujita (1)
GHC National Championship (3 times, current) – Sugiura (2) and Wagner Jr. (1)
GHC Tag Team Championship (6 times) – Sugiura and Sakamoto (1), Wagner Jr. and Duprée (2), Sugiura and Sakuraba (1), Sugiura and Suzuki (1) and Suzuki and Thatcher (1)
Global Tag League
(2019) – Sugiura and Sakamoto
(2020) – Wagner Jr. and Duprée
 Pro Wrestling Illustrated
Ranked Takashi Sugiura No. 67 of the top 500 singles wrestlers in the PWI 500 in 2021
Ranked Kazuyuki Fujita No. 117 of the top 500 singles wrestlers in the PWI 500 in 2022
Ranked Hideki Suzuki No. 150 of the top 500 singles wrestlers in the PWI 500 in 2019
Pro Wrestling Zero1
World Heavyeight Championship (1 time) – Sugiura
 Tokyo Sports Puroresu Awards
Best Tag Team Award – Sugiura and Sakuraba (2020)

See also
Stinger (professional wrestling)
Kongo (professional wrestling)
Choukibou-gun

Notes

References

Pro Wrestling Noah teams and stables
Independent promotions teams and stables
Japanese promotions teams and stables